The 2015 Women's East Asia Cup was a Twenty20 (T20) cricket tournament, which was held in South Korea in September 2017. The matches were all played at the Yeonhui Cricket Ground in Incheon.

The Twenty20 East Asia Cup is a new annual competition featuring China, Hong Kong, Japan and South Korea It will alternate each year between a men's and women's event. China defeated Hong Kong in the final to claim the inaugural East Asia Cup title. Matches did not have Twenty20 International status.

Squads

Round-robin

Points table

Matches

Play-offs

Third-place play-off

Final

References

External links
 Series home at CricHQ

International cricket competitions in 2015–16
2015 Women's Twenty20 East Asia Cup